Yuven Sundaramoorthy (born February 22, 2003) is an Indian-American racing driver. He is set to compete in the 2023 USF Pro 2000 Championship with Exclusive Autosport. He previously drove for Pabst Racing in 2022. Sundaramoorthy previously competed in the U.S. F2000 National Championship with Pabst Racing.

Racing career

USF Pro 2000 
On December 10, 2021, it was announced that Sundaramoorthy would move up to the Indy Pro 2000 Championship with Pabst Racing to compete in the 2022 season. He would have three podiums and end up finishing 10th in the standings.

In late September 2022, Sundaramoorthy announced that he would switch teams from Pabst Racing to drive for Exclusive Autosport for the 2023 season.

Racing record

Career summary 

* Season still in progress.

American open-wheel racing results

U.S. F2000 National Championship 
(key) (Races in bold indicate pole position) (Races in italics indicate fastest lap) (Races with * indicate most race laps led)

USF Pro 2000 Championship 
(key) (Races in bold indicate pole position) (Races in italics indicate fastest lap) (Races with * indicate most race laps led)

References 

2003 births
Living people
Racing drivers from Wisconsin
Formula Ford drivers
U.S. F2000 National Championship drivers
MRF Challenge Formula 2000 Championship drivers
Indy Pro 2000 Championship drivers